The Sullivan Act was a gun control law in New York state that took effect in 1911. The NY state law requires licenses for New Yorkers to possess firearms small enough to be concealed.  Private possession of such firearms without a license was a misdemeanor, and carrying them in public is a felony. The law was the subject of controversy regarding both its selective enforcement and the licensing bribery schemes it enabled. The act was named for its primary legislative sponsor, state senator Timothy Sullivan, a Tammany Hall Democrat.

For handguns, the Sullivan Act qualifies as a may issue act, meaning the local police have discretion to issue a concealed carry license, as opposed to a shall issue act, in which state authorities must give a concealed handgun license to any person who satisfies specific criteria, often a background check and a safety class. According to a 2022 study, the law had no impact on overall homicide rates, reduced overall suicide rates, and caused large and sustained decrease in gun-related suicide rates.

The case New York State Rifle & Pistol Association, Inc. v. Bruen was decided in the U.S. Supreme Court, evaluating the constitutionality of this law on Second Amendment grounds. Arguments were held in November of 2021, with the majority of the court striking down the "proper cause" requirement of the current law on June 23, 2022, for violating both the Second and Fourteenth Amendments to the United States Constitution.

History

Sullivan introduced the state-wide legislation "partly in response to a marked increase in highly publicized violent street crime below Fourteenth Street." Sullivan and other prominent New Yorkers were under public pressure to act, in the form of letters and recommendations from George Petit le Brun, who worked in the city's coroner's office, after a "brazen early afternoon" murder-suicide near Gramercy Park. The law went into effect on August 31, 1911.

The law also made it a felony to own or sell other items defined as so called "dangerous weapons", including "blackjacks, bludgeons, sandbags, sandclubs, billies, slungshots and metal knuckles."

According to Richard F. Welch, who wrote a 2009 biography of Sullivan, "all the available evidence indicates that Tim's fight to bring firearms under control sprang from heartfelt conviction." At the time, "some complained that the law would only succeed in disarming lawful citizens, while others suspected that Sullivan was just trying to rein in the thugs on his own payroll." Lawman Bat Masterson, a friend of Sullivan's, criticized the law as "obnoxious" and said that he questioned Sullivan's mental state of mind over the law.

New York City license holders

In New York State, apart from New York City, the practices for the issuance of concealed carry licenses vary from county to county.

In New York City, the licensing authority is the police department, which rarely issues carry licenses to anyone except retired police officers, or those who can describe why the nature of their employment (for example, a diamond merchant who regularly carries gemstones, or a district attorney who regularly prosecutes dangerous criminals) requires carrying a concealed handgun. Critics of the law have alleged that New Yorkers with political influence, wealth, or celebrity appear to be issued licenses more liberally. The New York Post, the New York Sun, and other newspapers have periodically obtained the list of licensees through Freedom of Information Act requests and have published the names of individuals they consider to be wealthy, famous, or politically connected that have been issued carry licenses by the city police department.

Several NYPD license division officers and others were convicted in federal court for participating in a bribery scheme where they accepted bribes for at least 2012 through 2016 in exchange for hundreds of permits in instances where permits would not be approved. These officers conspired with "expediting" businesses and some created these businesses after retiring from the police force.

Litigation

In the case Kachalsky v. Cacace (2012), a unanimous panel of the United States Court of Appeals for the Second Circuit upheld the constitutionality of the Sullivan Act, and rejected challengers' positions that New York state handgun law violates the Second and Fourteenth Amendments to the Constitution.

On April 26th, 2021, the Supreme Court of the United States granted certiorari in New York State Rifle & Pistol Association, Inc. v. Bruen, seeking to examine whether the Sullivan Act and the may-issue policies, in general, violate the Second Amendment to the United States Constitution.  On June 23rd, 2022, the "proper cause" requirement of the Sullivan Act was struck down by the Supreme Court of the United States, leaving the general licensing requirement in place.

Controversy

The first person convicted under the law was an Italian immigrant named Marino Rossi who was traveling to a job interview and carrying a revolver for fear of the Black Hand. At sentencing the judge declared: "It is unfortunate that this is the custom with you and your kind, and that fact, combined with your irascible nature, furnishes much of the criminal business in this country." Prior to Marino's arrest, others had been arrested under the new law but were released without charges. Whether this was part of the law's intent, it was passed on a wave of anti-immigrant and anti-Italian rhetoric as a measure to disarm an alleged Italian and immigrant criminal element. The police department who granted the licenses could easily discriminate against "undesirable" elements. Days before the law took effect The New York Times published an article saying "Low-browed foreigners bargained for weapons of every description and gloated over their good fortune in hearing of the drop in the gun market before it was too late". After Rossi's conviction The New York Times called this "warning to the Italian community" both "timely and exemplary".

According to New York City historian George Lankevich, the Act was passed so that Sullivan could have friends in the police force plant handguns on his rivals and take them to jail.

Constitutionality

In his concurring opinion in New York State Rifle & Pistol Association, Inc. v. Bruen, Justice Samuel Alito wrote

See also

Gun laws in New York
NY SAFE Act
Gun politics in the United States

References

United States firearms law
New York (state) statutes
1911 in American law
1911 in New York (state)
Gun politics in the United States
Anti-Italian sentiment